Manuel Gayoso (born 1 January 1944) is a Spanish middle-distance runner. He competed in the men's 800 metres at the 1972 Summer Olympics.

References

1944 births
Living people
Athletes (track and field) at the 1972 Summer Olympics
Spanish male middle-distance runners
Olympic athletes of Spain
Place of birth missing (living people)
Mediterranean Games bronze medalists for Spain
Mediterranean Games medalists in athletics
Athletes (track and field) at the 1967 Mediterranean Games
20th-century Spanish people